was a Japanese politician who served as Prime Minister of Japan from 1998 to 2000.

Obuchi was elected to the House of Representatives in Gunma Prefecture in 1963, becoming the youngest legislator in Japanese history, and was re-elected to his seat eleven times. Obuchi rose through the ranks of the Liberal Democratic Party and distinguished himself in the prominent posts of Chief Cabinet Secretary and Minister for Foreign Affairs in the 1980s and 1990s. Obuchi became Prime Minister in 1998 after replacing Ryutaro Hashimoto as president of the Liberal Democratic Party, and his premiership was characterized by attempts to reverse the effects of the Lost Decade. Obuchi entered a coma while in office in 2000, less than two years into his term as Prime Minister, and was replaced by Yoshiro Mori shortly before his death.

Early life
Obuchi was born on 25 June 1937 in Nakanojō, Gunma Prefecture, the son of Mitsuhei Obuchi, one of four representatives in the National Diet for a district in Gunma. At the age of 13, Obuchi transferred to a private middle school in Tokyo and lived in the city for the rest of his life. In 1958, Obuchi enrolled at Waseda University as an English literature major, in hopes of becoming a writer. When his father died that same year, Obuchi decided to follow in his footsteps as a politician, and continued as a graduate student in political science after graduating with his Bachelor of Arts degree in English in 1962.

Between January and September 1963, Obuchi travelled to thirty-eight countries, completely circumnavigating the globe and taking odd jobs as he went, as he was short on money. These included being a dishwasher, an assistant aikido instructor and a TV camera crew assistant in Berlin which was the most physically demanding. While in the United States, Obuchi met Attorney-General Robert F. Kennedy, who had given a speech the previous year at Waseda University where Obuchi was a student. 36 years later while on a trip to visit President Bill Clinton as the Prime Minister of Japan, he would again meet Kennedy's secretary who had helped to arrange the earlier visit.

Political career

That November, inspired by his talk with Kennedy, Obuchi ran for the House of Representatives and was elected to a seat representing Gunma's 3rd district, making him the youngest legislator in Japanese history at 26 years of age. Obuchi served his first term in the Diet while pursuing graduate studies at Waseda University.

In 1979, Obuchi became the director of the Prime Minister's office and director of the Okinawa Development Agency, his first cabinet post. Obuchi served there for eight years before becoming Chief Cabinet Secretary in 1987. Two years later, Obuchi formally announced the death of Emperor Shōwa. As Chief Cabinet Secretary, Obuchi was tasked in making the famous announcement of the new era name "Heisei" for the new Emperor Akihito. He was then nicknamed "Uncle Heisei" (平成おじさん, "Heisei Ojisan").

In 1991, Obuchi became secretary general of the Liberal Democratic Party (LDP), and in 1994 became its vice president. In 1997, Ryutaro Hashimoto appointed Obuchi as Minister of Foreign Affairs, where he distinguished himself in negotiations with Russia over Japanese claims in the Kuril Islands, as well as negotiations over the unification of Korea.

Premiership
In 1998, Hashimoto resigned as LDP president when the party lost its majority in the House of Councillors, the upper house of the Diet, and Obuchi was named his successor. When the Diet designated a new Prime Minister, Obuchi became only the second LDP candidate not to win the support of the House of Councillors. However, the Constitution of Japan stipulates that if the two chambers cannot agree on a choice for Prime Minister, the choice of the House of Representatives is deemed to be that of the Diet. With the LDP's large majority in the lower house, Obuchi was formally appointed Prime Minister on 30 July.

During his term as Prime Minister, Obuchi was focused on two major issues: signing a peace treaty with Russia and reviving the Japanese economy of the Lost Decade. His solution to the latter was to increase public spending and lowering income taxes, which briefly slowed the recession but ultimately did very little to turn it around. One of his government actions was to give shopping coupons to 35 million citizens in the hope it would spark a consumer boom. Obuchi's Russia policy also eluded implementation before his death. Obuchi's fiscal policy focused on strengthening the core capital requirements for financial institutions while issuing more Japanese government bonds to finance public infrastructure, which boosted the rising Japanese public debt.

Obuchi was known to have regularly enjoyed playing squash at the courts in the Canadian Embassy in Tokyo`s Azabu.

Death
On 1 April 2000, Obuchi suffered a massive stroke and slipped into a coma at Tokyo's Juntendo University Hospital while still in office. When it became apparent Obuchi would never regain consciousness, he was replaced by Yoshirō Mori on 5 April. Obuchi died on 14 May at the age of 62; a state funeral was held in his honour at the Nippon Budokan on 8 June and was attended by foreign dignitaries from 156 countries and 22 organizations, including about 25 heads of state. Notable presences at Obuchi’s funeral included UN Secretary General Kofi Annan, U.S. president Bill Clinton, and South Korean president Kim Dae-jung.

Personal life

Obuchi married environmental essayist Chizuko Ono in 1967. They were introduced by Tomisaburo Hashimoto, a Diet member and relative of Prime Minister Ryutaro Hashimoto. They had one son and two daughters. Their younger daughter, Yūko Obuchi, ran for and was elected to the former prime minister's Diet seat in the 2000 election. Obuchi was a great fan of the works of the late historical novelist Ryōtarō Shiba, and a particular admirer of Sakamoto Ryōma, a key figure in the events leading to the Meiji Restoration.

Obuchi also had the unusual hobby of collecting figures of oxen. It relates to the fact that he was born in the Year of the Ox, the second year of the Chinese zodiac. He started collecting the figures following his initial election to the Diet in 1963, and after three and a half decades, the collection numbered in the thousands. He was also devoted to aikido and enjoyed golf as well.

Honours

Medal of Honour with Yellow Ribbon for Best Father (1999)
Grand Cordon of the Order of the Chrysanthemum (14 May 2000; posthumous)
Senior Second Rank (14 May 2000; posthumous)
Golden Pheasant Award of the Scout Association of Japan (1998)

References

External links

 "Profile & Personality of Prime Minister Keizo Obuchi." Japanese Prime Minister's Office site (Japanese version)

|-

|-

|-

|-

|-

|-

|-

1937 births
2000 deaths
20th-century prime ministers of Japan
People from Gunma Prefecture
Foreign ministers of Japan
Prime Ministers of Japan
Waseda University alumni
Liberal Democratic Party (Japan) politicians
Politicians from Gunma Prefecture
Members of the House of Representatives from Gunma Prefecture